The United States Border Patrol operates 71 traffic checkpoints, including 33 permanent traffic checkpoints, near the Mexico–United States border. The stated primary purpose of these inspection stations is to deter illegal immigration and smuggling activities. After the September 11 attacks in 2001, they took on the additional role of terrorism deterrence. Their situation at interior locations allow them to deter illegal activities that may have bypassed official border crossings along the frontier. The checkpoints are divided among nine Border Patrol sectors. There are a number of these checkpoints near the northern border of the contiguous U.S. as well (such as in the states of New York or Maine), within  of the Canada–U.S. border.

Role of checkpoints 
The checkpoints are described as "the third layer in the Border Patrol's three-layer strategy", following "line watch" and "roving patrol" operations near the border.  According to the U.S. Government Accountability Office,

Border Patrol agents at checkpoints have legal authority that agents do not have when patrolling areas away from the border. The United States Supreme Court ruled that Border Patrol agents may stop a vehicle at fixed checkpoints for brief questioning of its occupants even if there is no reason to believe that the particular vehicle contains illegal people.  The Court further held that Border Patrol agents "have wide discretion" to refer motorists selectively to a secondary inspection area for additional brief questioning. In contrast, the Supreme Court held that Border Patrol agents on roving patrol may stop a vehicle only if they have reasonable suspicion that the vehicle contains people who may be illegally in the United States—a higher threshold for stopping and questioning motorists than at checkpoints.  The constitutional threshold for searching a vehicle is the same, however, and must be supported by either consent or probable cause, whether in the context of a roving patrol or a checkpoint search.

Under US law, people who enter the US without inspection (EWI) can be subjected to expedited removal if they are found within 100 miles of the border. This power has been subject to heavy criticism by the American Civil Liberties Union.

Documentation at checkpoint
No documentation is required at a Border Patrol checkpoint for US citizens; however, lawful permanent residents (LPRs) are required to carry their registration cards (green cards) "at all times" according to federal law. People in a non-immigrant status should carry proper documentation.  There has been heavy criticism of Border Patrol for arresting people in a non-immigrant status at checkpoints (especially in New York), even though the aliens are lawfully present.

List of permanent checkpoints

California 
 San Clemente - located 7 miles south of San Clemente on Interstate 5. --
 Temecula - located 24 miles north of Escondido on Interstate 15. -- 
 Highway 79 - located 1 mile west of Sunshine Summit.
 I-8 West - located 3 miles east of Pine Valley on Interstate 8. --
 Highway 94 - located 24 miles east of San Diego on California State Route 94. --  
 Highway 78/86 - located just south of the intersection of California State Routes 78 and 86, just west of the Salton Sea, controlling northbound traffic only. -- 
 Highway 111 - located between Niland and Bombay Beach. -- 
 Highway S2 - located 7 miles north of Ocotillo and I-8 in eastern San Diego County on S2 (Imperial Hwy/Sweeney Pass Road) between I-8 and State Route 78
 Highway 78 - located just north of Olgilby Rd (S34),50 miles south of Blythe, and 40 miles east of Brawley. Controlling northbound traffic only.

Arizona 
 I-8 (eastbound only) - located 15 miles east of Yuma on Interstate 8. --
 I-19 - heading north from Nogales just north of Tubac. --
 Arivaca Road - heading northeast through Amado, located near mile marker 22 --
 AZ Hwy 286 - heading north from Sasabe to Three Points. --
 AZ Hwy 86 - heading east, off the TO reservation, before three points --
 Indian Highway 15 North of Sells near Kahatk.  --
 AZ Hwy 90 - heading north from Whetstone to Benson --
 AZ Hwy 80 - heading north from Tombstone to Benson (at junction with AZ 82 west) --.
 US Hwy 95 - heading north from Yuma to Quartzsite 53.4 mi N of Yuma 33.259464, -114.243200
 AZ Hwy 85 - located 4.7 miles south of Why --
 AZ Hwy 85 - located 18.4 miles south of Gila Bend  --

New Mexico
 I-10 West - located 22 miles west of Las Cruces on Interstate 10, between mile markers 120–121. --
 I-25 North - located 23 miles north of Las Cruces on Interstate 25. --
 U.S. 70 East - located 15 miles southwest of Alamogordo on U.S. Route 70, between mile markers 198–199. --
 Alamogordo - located 30 miles south of Alamogordo on US Route 54, between mile markers 40–41. --
 NM Highway 11 - located 22.6 miles south of Deming on State Road 11, between mile markers 12–13.  --
 NM Highway 185 - located 13 miles northwest of Radium Springs on State Road 185, between mile markers 25–26. --

Texas 

 U.S. Route 62 – 33 miles east of El Paso. --
 Sierra Blanca - located between El Paso and Van Horn, 5 miles west of Sierra Blanca on Interstate 10. --
 Eagle Pass - located 11 miles east of Eagle Pass on U.S. Route 57. --
 Eagle Pass/Carrizo Springs - located 30 miles east-southeast of Eagle Pass on U.S. Route 277. --
 Brackettville/Uvalde - located 60 miles east of Del Rio, Texas on U.S. Route 90. --
 Del Rio - located 25 miles north of Del Rio on U.S. Route 377. --
 Laredo - located 29 miles north of Laredo on Interstate 35. --
 Laredo 83 - located 35 miles north of Laredo on U.S. Route 83. --
 Freer - located 16 miles west of Freer on U.S. Route 59. --
 Oilton - located 6 miles east of Oilton on State Highway 359. --
 Falfurrias - located 14 miles south of Falfurrias on U.S. Route 281. -- (See Brooks County, Texas.)
 Sarita - located 14 miles south of Sarita on U.S. Route 77. --
 Hebbronville - located 1 mile south of Hebbronville on State Highway 16  --
 Hebbronville - located 50 yards south on Farm to Market Road 1017 at "T" intersection of State Highway 285.  --
 Alpine - located 10 miles south of Alpine on State Highway 118. --
 Brownsville - located on Boca Chica Highway (State Highway 4) leading to Boca Chica Beach  --
 Marfa - located 4.5 miles south of Marfa on U.S. Route 67 --
 Marathon - located 4.5 miles south of Marathon on U.S. Route 385 --

Other maps
An external (unofficial) Google Map of reported checkpoints can also be found here. This may list other checkpoints.

Tactical checkpoints
In fiscal year 2008 thirty-nine tactical checkpoints were in operation.  Tactical checkpoints lack permanent buildings, and "support permanent checkpoints by monitoring and inspecting traffic on secondary roads that the Border Patrol determined are likely to be used by individuals in the country illegally or smugglers to evade apprehension at permanent checkpoints".  A tactical checkpoint might consist of vehicles, traffic cones, signs, a portable water supply, a cage for canines (if deployed), and portable rest facilities.

Due to Congressional restrictions against the funding of permanent checkpoints in the Tucson sector, all of its checkpoints are tactical checkpoints.  These were required to relocate every seven days, amended to every 14 days in 2005.  Due to the need for road shoulder space and restrictions on placing checkpoints near curves, the number of sites is limited, and the relocation in practice means that checkpoints are periodically shut down.  In 2005, the median tactical checkpoint nationally was active for 2 hours daily, as opposed to over 23 hours daily for permanent checkpoints; however the Tucson sector's checkpoint on Highway 19 was active 22 hours daily.  A draft plan for the I-19 checkpoint in 2009 proposed to model it on the largest previous permanent checkpoint, the I-35 checkpoint north of Laredo, Texas, but would surpass it in size (18 acres) and inspection lanes (8 primary, 7 secondary).  A number of community concerns were addressed, such as placement of canopies for dark sky restrictions for a local observatory, off-highway location, rumble strips, signage, and mitigation of traffic congestion.  A community recommendation to "seek to mitigate noise" was to be "researched and considered".

Effectiveness and criticisms

Benefits 
The fairly comprehensive and aforementioned GAO report entitled BORDER PATROL assigns mixed success to border checkpoints.  Positive results include the apprehension of nearly 17,000 people in the country illegally at interior checkpoints in 2008.  The report further states that, "More than 705,000 total Border Patrol apprehensions [occurred] along the southwest border in fiscal year 2008."  The Border Patrol also "encountered 530 aliens from special interest countries, which are countries the Department of State has determined to represent a potential terrorist threat to the United States."  There were also over 3,500 drug seizures at all southwest border checkpoints combined in 2008.

Changes in 2008
Staffing levels were substantially increased in 2008.  The Laredo sector, for instance, increased its number of agents from 1200 in 2007 to approximately 1636 in 2008.  Upgraded infrastructure and technology increased deterrence and detection capability in the Laredo sector.  Additions include cameras, license plate readers, and vehicle and cargo inspection systems (VACIS).  Laredo also implemented a prosecution initiative in 2008.  Named Operation Streamline, the goal was "to prosecute and remove all violators charged with illegal entry in target areas in the sector".

Shortcomings 
A shortcoming cited by the same GAO report were the inaccuracies represented by the report's title.  The report states, "Our analysis showed that the actual checkpoint performance results were incorrectly reported for two of the three measures in fiscal year 2007 and for one measure in fiscal year 2008.  As a result, the Border Patrol incorrectly reported that it met its checkpoint performance targets for these two measures."

An analysis of the aforementioned GAO report criticized Border Patrol for its ineffective non-border checkpoints vs. actual border crossings.  It stated, "There were 704,000 interdictions at actual border crossings in 2008; however, there were only 17,000 interdictions at internal non-border checkpoints.  This 17,000 figure represents 2.4% of interdictions, but it took 4% of agents to accomplish this goal."  The analysis further states regarding the Tucson sector that, "Actual border interdictions numbered 320,000, but internal non-border checkpoint interdictions numbered 1,800.  This means the number of interdictions per agent at the actual border was 116, but the number of interdictions per agent at internal non-border checkpoints was only 8."  The analysis finally questions why the stated goal of DHS "is to detect and apprehend 30% of major illegal activity [at the border]."  It asked why 70% of illegal activity is conceded at the actual border.

Some residents of Arivaca, Arizona, have stated they are regularly subjected to harassment, delays, searches, and racial profiling at the internal checkpoint near their community.  They questioned the effectiveness of the checkpoint, and began monitoring it in 2014 to determine its effectiveness.

Constitutionality 
Internal checkpoints have also been criticized for violating the Fourth Amendment to the United States Constitution which prohibits "unreasonable searches and seizures", although United States v. Martinez-Fuerte has affirmed their constitutionality.  The U.S. Border Patrol has stated: "Although motorists are not legally required to answer the questions 'Are you a U.S. citizen, and where are you headed?' they will not be allowed to proceed until the inspecting agent is satisfied that the occupants of vehicles traveling through the checkpoint are legally present in the U.S."

Movie
 Missing in Brooks County is a feature-length documentary that examines the deaths in Brooks County, Texas, of migrants seeking to avoid the U.S. Border Patrol interior checkpoint in Falfurrias. The film has won numerous awards after its presentation at movie festivals. As of November 2021, RottenTomatoes has given it a 100% rating. It was released for streaming November 2, 2021, and has been shown in selected theaters. It will be shown on PBS's Independent Lens series in January 2022.

See also 
 Freedom of movement under United States law
 Border zone
 Brooks County, Texas
 Immigrant warning sign
 Michigan Department of State Police v. Sitz
 Visible Intermodal Prevention and Response team

References

Further reading
 Osete, Jesus A., The Praetorians: An Analysis of U.S. Border Patrol Checkpoints Following "Martinez-Fuerte". 93 Wash. U. L. Rev. 803 (2016). 
 
 

Mexico–United States border crossings
United States Border Patrol